John Kirkland Reid (born August 21, 1973) is a Scottish-Canadian country music artist. Reid moved to Canada in July 1989 when he was 16. His father, a diesel mechanic, wanted to give Reid and his brother opportunities he did not think they would have in Scotland. He graduated from Turner Fenton Secondary School in Brampton, Ontario, in 1992. Reid went on to attend Bishop's University in Lennoxville, Quebec, where he met his wife (and was a kicker on the varsity football team).

Reid moved to Nashville, Tennessee to make country music; he and his family reside in Nashville. He was nominated for the 2008 Juno Award for Country Recording of the Year for Kicking Stones. Reid was named Male Artist of the Year at both the 2008 and 2009 CCMA Awards. He also performed at the Canada Day celebrations on Parliament Hill on July 1, 2010, which the Queen and Prince Philip attended.

Music career

Another Day, Another Dime and Johnny Reid
Reid's debut album, Another Day, Another Dime, was released in 1997 on JCD Records. No singles were ever released from the album. However, it was his second album, which was self-titled and released in 2000, where he saw minimal chart success. Three singles from this album were released and all three of which charted. The lead-off and debut single, "Given Up on Me", was a minor hit on the RPM Country Tracks chart. It reached a peak of No. 45. A second single, "Runnin' Wild" charted at No. 50. The album's third and final single, "She Don't Wanna Hear", just missed the Top 40 of the country chart, peaking at No. 41.

Born to Roll
Reid's first single in four years, "You Still Own Me", was released in 2004. It was the lead-off single to his third studio album, Born to Roll. The charted in the 20 of the Canadian country charts. Born to Roll was released on March 15, 2005, via Open Road Recordings, and peaked at No. 5 on the Canadian Top Country Albums chart. A second single, "Sixty to Zero", charted to No. 19, however it was the album's third single to get Reid into the Top 10 of the charts. "Missing an Angel" eventually reached No. 6 on the charts, giving him his first Top 10 single of his career. A fourth single, "Time Flies", also managed to chart in the Top 10, peaking at No. 9. A fifth and final single, "Gypsy in My Soul", only made No. 12. Born to Roll became his first certified album, being certified Gold by the Canadian Recording Industry Association (CRIA).

In 2007, Canadian music group Emerson Drive covered "You Still Own Me". They took the song to No. 22 on the U.S. Billboard Hot Country Songs chart.

Kicking Stones and Dance with Me
In 2007, a new single entitled "Love Sweet Love", would be released and act as the lead-off single to Kicking Stones, which was released on April 10, 2007. The single peaked at No. 11 on the Canadian country charts and was followed by a string of Top 20 singles. The second single, the album's title track, reached No. 13, and "Darlin'", the album's third single, became Reid's first Top 5 single. Two additional singles, "Thank You" and "Out of the Blue", were released, peaking at No. 13 and No. 7 on the charts, respectively.

Reid's fifth studio album, Dance with Me, was released in March 2009, and debuted at No. 1 on the Canadian Top Country Albums chart and No. 3 on the Canadian Albums Chart. "A Woman Like You" was released as the first single from the album and reached No. 4 on the country charts, peaking No. 4 in 2009. The title track was then released and reached No. 10, followed by "Old Flame", which has so far peaked in the Top 10.

A Christmas album, entitled Christmas, was released November 10, 2009. Reid's first live DVD, Live at the Jubilee was released on February 9, 2010.

A Place Called Love
In 2010, Johnny Reid signed with EMI for the release of his next studio album, A Place Called Love, released August 31, 2010. The first single, "Today I'm Gonna Try and Change the World" was released on June 7. Reid's second live DVD, Heart & Soul was released on March 29, 2011 in Canada.

Fire It Up
2012 marked the release of Johnny Reid's second album for EMI, Fire It Up. The title track was released on January 10 to Canadian radio and iTunes. The album features Canadian guest artists Carolyn Dawn Johnson and Serena Ryder. The album was also released as a deluxe version with four bonus songs and a DVD featuring the making of the album.

Reid released his second Christmas album, A Christmas Gift to You, on October 22, 2013.

What Love Is All About
Reid's first studio album for Universal Music Canada, What Love Is All About, was released on November 13, 2015. The album features a duet with Kardinal Offishall. Reid's first single off the album was "A Picture of You". It was followed by "Honey Honey".

Revival 
Reid released Revival with Universal Music Canada on November 3, 2017. The album featured 13 original songs and marked Reid's most soul-inspired album to date. In 2018, Revival was nominated for two JUNO Awards in the categories of Album of the Year and Adult Contemporary Album of the Year. On November 9, 2018, Reid released Revival Live, his first live album, which was recorded during the 2018 Revival Live Canadian tour.

Maggie (the Musical) 
In 2022, Reid announced that his new musical, co-written with Canadian playwright Matt Murray, would premiere at Theatre Aquarius in Hamilton, Ontario in 2023. The show is also scheduled to headline The Charlottetown Festival in summer 2023 and will have a limited run at The Savoy Theatre in Glace Bay, NS in Fall 2023. Set in Lanarkshire, Scotland, Maggie is based on a true story and inspired by Reid's grandmother. It features music co-written by Johnny Reid, Matt Murray and Canadian musical theatre composer Bob Foster and is produced by Michael Rubinoff, the originating producer of Come From Away. Originally titled My Bonnie Lass, the show was developed at Sheridan College’s prestigious Canadian Music Theatre Project in 2018, receiving a studio theatre production at the college in 2019.

Discography

 Another Day, Another Dime (1997)
 Johnny Reid (2000)
 Born to Roll (2005)
 Kicking Stones (2007)
 Dance with Me (2009)
 A Place Called Love (2010)
 Fire It Up (2012)
 What Love Is All About (2015)
 Revival (2017)
 Revival Live (2018)
 My Kind of Christmas (2019)
 My Kind of Christmas - Deluxe Edition (2020)
Love Someone (2021)

Awards and nominations

Band
Ben Rutz (fiddle)
Michael Shand (Keyboards)
Yvan Petit (Lead Guitar)
Mark Selby (Guitar)
Charles Fields (Drums/Percussion)
Nick Czarnogorski (Bass) Regular session musician for Fatlabs studios. Also plays in a band named Ride The Tiger.
Saidah Baba Talibah (Backup Vocals)
Miku Graham (Backup Vocals)
Quisha Wint (Backup Vocals)
Jon Jackson (Sax)
Chris West (Sax)
Jon-Paul Frappier (Trumpet)
Oscar Utterstrom (Trombone)
Crystal Taliefero (Percussion, sax, acoustic guitar, Backup Vocals) on the 2012 Fire It Up tour.

References

External links

Official Site
Johnny Reid Videos On CMT Canada

1974 births
Living people
Canadian country singer-songwriters
Canadian male singer-songwriters
Open Road Recordings artists
Scottish emigrants to Canada
People from Lanark
Canadian Country Music Association Fans' Choice Award winners
Canadian Country Music Association Male Artist of the Year winners
Canadian Country Music Association Rising Star Award winners
Canadian Country Music Association Top Selling Canadian Album winners
Canadian Country Music Association Songwriter(s) of the Year winners
Juno Award for Country Album of the Year winners
Juno Award for Adult Contemporary Album of the Year winners
Canadian Country Music Association Single of the Year winners
21st-century Canadian male singers